The 2016 SLFA First Division was the 38th season of top-division association football in Saint Lucia. The SLFA First Division season began on 22 October 2016, and concluded on 8 December 2016.

Only partial information has been reported from the Saint Lucia Football Association, but from what was reported, Survivals FC won the league title, accumulating the most points after seven league matches. This gave the club their first Lucian league title.

Teams 
A total of eight clubs participated during the 2016 campaign. Apparently, these teams qualified to play in the reformed league through their performances in the 2015 SLFA President's Cup.

Table 
Top three:
Survivals FC
Big Players FC
Northern United All Stars

It is unknown who finished 4th through 8th during the season.

References 

SLFA First Division
Saint Lucia
Saint Lucia
football